Rubí Centre is a railway station of the Ferrocarrils de la Generalitat de Catalunya (FGC) train system in Rubí, Barcelona Province, Catalonia. It is served by FGC lines S1 and S7. The station is in fare zone 2C.

The station was opened in 1918 and rebuilt in 1993.

References

Stations on the Barcelona–Vallès Line
Railway stations in Vallès Occidental
Railway stations in Spain opened in 1918